Richárd Vernes (born 24 February 1992) is a Hungarian footballer who plays for BVSC-Zugló.

Club career
On 1 September 2021, Vernes joined Győri ETO on a season-long loan.

In February 2023, Vernes moved to BVSC-Zugló in the third-tier Nemzeti Bajnokság III.

Career statistics

References

External links
HLSZ

1992 births
Footballers from Budapest
Living people
Hungarian footballers
Hungary youth international footballers
Hungary under-21 international footballers
Association football midfielders
Budapest Honvéd FC players
Budapest Honvéd FC II players
Central Coast Mariners FC players
Paksi FC players
Zalaegerszegi TE players
Diósgyőri VTK players
Hapoel Kfar Saba F.C. players
Vasas SC players
Győri ETO FC players
Budapesti VSC footballers
Nemzeti Bajnokság II players
Nemzeti Bajnokság I players
A-League Men players
Israeli Premier League players
Nemzeti Bajnokság III players
Hungarian expatriate footballers
Expatriate soccer players in Australia
Hungarian expatriate sportspeople in Australia
Expatriate footballers in Israel
Hungarian expatriate sportspeople in Israel